The Battle of Bloody Run was fought in March or April of 1656 near Richmond, Virginia.

In 1654, the expansion of the Iroquois Nation (during the Beaver Wars) displaced several tribes from their homelands around Lake Erie.  One tribe moved south into Virginia, settling temporarily around the James River.  Records of the time refer to these people as the "Richahecrians", while James Lederer said they were "Mahocks and Nahyssans".  The colonists in nearby Richmond were uneasy with the proximity of a potentially hostile force.  Within two years, the Virginia General Assembly had given permission to Colonel Edward Hill to remove the Indian presence.  His orders specifically stated that he was not to use force unless necessary. The General Assembly also specifically sent messages to Chief Totopotomoi and the Chichahominy Indians, requesting their assistance.

Colonel Hill led the Colonial Rangers, reinforced by 100 Pamunkey warriors under Chief Totopotomoi.  When five "Richahecrian" chiefs came to negotiate, Hill ordered they be taken and killed, which resulted in the attack by the opposing force.  During the battle, Hill and his men retreated, resulting in the slaughter of their Indian allies, including Totopotomoi himself.  The large number of casualties—nearly all of the Pamunkey warriors, and a good part of the Colonial Rangers—earned the site its name of Bloody Run, as the creek was said to have run red with blood.  Afterward, Hill was disgraced because of his defeat, censured by the Virginia Assembly, and stripped of his rank.

The creek was the site of another bloody battle 20 years later, during Bacon’s Rebellion, in 1676.  More Indian incursions led the Virginia colonists to authorize Nathaniel Bacon to march against the Indians.  The battle of Bacon’s Quarter Branch took place near Bloody Run, and the creek was once again christened with blood.

Today, the site of the battle had been paved over and the creek and spring have dried up.  The only indication of the site is a state-erected marker commemorating the event in the northwest corner of Chimborazo Park.

External links
Virginia Historical Marker: Battle of Bloody Run

References

History of Richmond, Virginia